The Château du Francport is an historic château in Choisy-au-Bac, Oise, Hauts-de-France, France. It was built in the 19th century. A photograph taken by Count Olympe Aguado is in the collection of the J. Paul Getty Museum in Los Angeles, California. Acquired by the Anglo-French Hotel Management Limited to turn it into a luxury hotel, the project fell through in 2009. However, by 2014 it was owned by Terres de Kéops and run as a restaurant known as the Château des Bonshommes.

References

Houses completed in the 19th century
Châteaux in Oise
19th-century architecture in France